Denis Vitalyevich Koberskiy (born 24 February 1974 in Khabarovsk) is a former Russian football player.

His father Vitali Koberskiy is a coach and a former player.

References

1974 births
Sportspeople from Khabarovsk
Living people
Soviet footballers
FC Luch Vladivostok players
Russian footballers
FC Zhemchuzhina Sochi players
Russian Premier League players
FC Kuban Krasnodar players
FC Oryol players
FC Okean Nakhodka players

Association football midfielders